Agárd is a small village on the shores of Lake Velence in Hungary, administratively belongs to the municipality (town) of Gárdony. It is a popular tourist destination amongst Hungarians.

Information 
https://www.telepules.com/en/gardony/tourism.html ?

Populated places in Fejér County